The Jewish Legion was an unofficial name used to refer to five battalions of the British Army's Royal Fusiliers regiment, which consisted of Jewish volunteers recruited during World War I. In 1915, the British Army raised the Zion Mule Corps, a transportation unit of Jewish volunteers, for service in the Gallipoli campaign. Two years later in August 1917, the decision was made to raise an infantry battalion of Jewish soldiers which would be integrated into an existing British Army regiment. 

Eventually, due to large recruitment numbers, including Jews from Russia and the United States, five battalions were raised and integrated into the Royal Fusiliers; collectively, they were referred to as the "Jewish Legion". The new units raised were designated as the 38th, 39th, 40th, 41st and 42nd battalions of the regiment. The Jewish Legion saw action during the Sinai and Palestine campaign, where they fought at the Battle of Megiddo before being reduced to one battalion, nicknamed the "First Judaeans".

Background

In November 1914, David Ben-Gurion and Yitzhak Ben-Zvi proposed to the Ottoman commander in Jerusalem that a Jewish Legion could be raised to fight with the Ottoman Army. The proposal was approved and training began but was soon cancelled by Djemal Pasha, who became known for persecuting Zionists. Ben-Gurion and Ben-Zvi were among thousands of Jews deported.

In February 1915, a small committee in Alexandria approved a plan of Zeev Jabotinsky and Joseph Trumpeldor to form a military unit from Russian Jewish émigrés from Palestine that would participate in the British effort to seize Palestine from the Ottoman Empire. The British commander General Maxwell met a delegation, led by Jabotinsky, on 15 March. The General said he was unable, under the Army Act, to enlist foreign nationals as fighting troops, but that he could form them into a volunteer transport Mule Corps. Jabotinsky rejected the idea and left for Europe to seek other support for a Jewish unit, but Trumpeldor accepted it and began recruiting volunteers from among the local Jews in Egypt and those who had been deported there by the Ottomans in the previous year. The British Army formed 650 of them into the Zion Mule Corps, of which 562 served in the Gallipoli Campaign.

Gallipoli Front

The need on the Gallipoli peninsula for means to carry water to the troops was considered so urgent that in mid-April, a request was forwarded to Egypt for the Zion Mule Corps to be sent immediately, regardless of its lack of equipment. Its commanding officer was Lieutenant-Colonel John Henry Patterson, DSO, an Irish Protestant, and Captain Trumpeldor was Second-in-command. The Zion Mule Corps landed at Cape Helles from  four weeks after being raised, having been stranded at Mudros when its ship ran aground. The corps was embarked in the same ship as the Indian 9th Mule Corps bound for Gaba Tepe and so a detour to Helles was ordered. The Zion Mule Corps was disembarked under artillery fire from the Asiatic shore, with help of volunteers from the 9th Mule Corps and began carrying supplies forward immediately.

A Distinguished Conduct Medal was awarded to Private M. Groushkowsky, who, near Krithia on 5 May, prevented his mules from stampeding under heavy bombardment and despite being wounded in both arms, delivered the ammunition. Trumpeldor was shot through the shoulder but refused to leave the battlefield. Patterson later wrote: "Many of the Zionists whom I thought somewhat lacking in courage showed themselves fearless to a degree when under heavy fire, while Captain Trumpeldor actually revelled in it, and the hotter it became the more he liked it ..."

The men returned to Alexandria on 10 January 1916. The Zion Mule Corps were disbanded on 26 May 1916. The Commonwealth War Graves Commission lists 13 members of the Zion Mule Corps as fatalities.

Formation
Between the dissolution of the Zion Mule Corps and the formation of the Jewish Legion, Jabotinsky and Trumpeldor and 120 Zion Mule Corps veterans served together in 16 Platoon of the 20th Battalion, London Regiment.

In August 1917, the formation of a Jewish battalion was officially announced. The unit was designated as the 38th Battalion of the Royal Fusiliers and included British volunteers, as well as members of the former Zion Mule Corps and a large number of Russian Jews. In April 1918, it was joined by the 39th Battalion, raised at Fort Edward, Nova Scotia, which was made up almost entirely of Jews who were resident in the United States and Canada.

Thousands of Palestinian Jews also applied to join the Legion and in 1918, more than 1,000 were enlisted. Ninety-two Ottoman Jews who had been captured in the fighting earlier were also permitted to enlist. This group was organized as the 40th Battalion. The 41st and 42nd Battalions were depot battalions stationed in Plymouth, England. In his memoirs about the Legion Jabotinsky described the composition of the 5,000-member Legion as; "thirty-four per cent from the United States, thirty per cent from Palestine, twenty-eight per cent from England, six per cent from Canada, one per cent Ottoman war prisoners, one per cent from Argentina." The soldiers of the 38th, 39th and later the 40th Battalions of the Royal Fusiliers served in the Jordan Valley and fought the Ottomans north of Jerusalem.

Action in the Jordan Valley, 1918

In June 1918, the volunteers of the 38th Battalion began engaging the Ottomans some twenty miles north of Jerusalem. In the fighting in the Jordan Valley, more than twenty Legionnaires were killed, wounded, or captured, the rest came down with malaria, and thirty of this group later died. The 38th Battalion served in the 31st Brigade of the 10th (Irish) Division. The Legion then came under the command of Major-General Edward Chaytor, who commanded the ANZAC Mounted Division.

Besides various skirmishes, the Legion also participated in the Battle of Megiddo in mid-September 1918, widely considered to have been one of the final and decisive victories of the Ottoman front.

The Legion's mission was to cross the Jordan River. Jabotinsky led the effort. Later, he was decorated and Chaytor told the Jewish troops: "By forcing the Jordan fords, you helped in no small measure to win the great victory gained at Damascus."

In August 1919 fifty-six men from the Battalion were court-martialled for refusing to continue guarding prisoners of war in the Egyptian desert. They received sentences of 2 to 7 years hard labour.

Legacy

Almost all the members of the Jewish regiments were discharged immediately after the end of the First World War in November 1918. Some of them returned to their respective countries, others settled in Palestine to realize their Zionist aspirations – among them the future first Prime Minister of Israel, David Ben-Gurion. In late 1919, the Jewish Legion was reduced to one battalion titled First Judaeans, and awarded a distinctive cap badge, a menorah with the Hebrew word קדימה Kadima (forward) at the base.

Former members of the Legion took part in the defence of Jewish communities during the Riots in Palestine of 1920, which resulted in Jabotinsky's arrest. Two former members of the Legion were killed with Trumpeldor at Tel Hai. One former member of the Legion was killed in Tel Aviv-Yafo during the Jaffa riots of 1921. Some members of the Jewish Legion settled in moshav Avihayil and moshav Be'er Tuvia. Another former member died in service in the Second World War.
At least two of the survivors of the Jewish Legion passed the century mark:
Harry Rosenblatt of New York who died 31 August 1994 age 101.
Samuel Kernerman of Canada (Toronto) died December 2000 age 101.

Gallery

Notable members 

 John Henry Patterson – Commander of Zion Mule Corps and 38th Battalion Royal Fusiliers
 Colonel Eliezer Margolin - Commander of the 39th Battalion Royal Fusiliers
 Gershon Agron, Mayor of Jerusalem
 Nathan Ausubel, Jewish-American author
 Yitzhak Ben-Zvi, second Israeli President
 Abraham (Albert) Davidson, RSM and Musketry Instructor, 38th Battalion. Orphaned as a child, he by chance found his late parents' families when on active service in Tel Aviv.
 Yaakov Dori, Haganah leader; first Chief of Staff of the Israel Defense Forces, President of the Technion – Israel Institute of Technology
 Maxwell H. Dubin, rabbi, Wilshire Boulevard Temple, Los Angeles
 Sir Jacob Epstein, British sculptor
 Levi Eshkol, third Prime Minister of Israel
 Louis Fischer, Jewish-American journalist and author
 Eliyahu Golomb, founding member of the Haganah
 Dr. Hirsh Loeb Gordon, rabbi and physician
 David Grün, later Ben-Gurion, first Israeli Prime Minister
 Nachum Gutman, Israeli painter
 Joseph Hecht, first Chairman of the Haganah 1921-1930
 Israel Hirschfeld, Israeli painter
 Dov Hoz, Zionist activist, Haganah fighter
 Julius Jacobs- brother-in-law of Moshe Smilansky; killed in the King David Hotel bombing, 22 July 1946. 
 Bernard Joseph, later Dov Yosef, Governor of Jewish Jerusalem during the 1948 siege; longtime Labor MK
 Berl Katznelson, Zionist philosopher and activist
 Reuven Katzenelson – Sergeant under Joseph Trumpeldor at Battle of Gallipoli and father of Shmuel Tamir
 Bert "Yank" Levy Internationalist in Spain and military instructor for the British Home Guard. His work served as the basis for a popular handbook on guerrilla warfare.
 Gideon Mer, physician, veteran of Zion Mule Corps, Jewish Legion and British Army in the Second World War. Served as a medic in the 1947–1949 Palestine war; later worked in the Israeli Ministry of Health. (Note: he is the unnamed officer in charge of an anti-malaria programme during  the Second World War – mentioned in Martin Sugarman's article on the Zion Mule Corps.)
 Nehemiah Rubitzov, father of Yitzhak Rabin
 Israel Rosenberg, also known as 'The grandfather of the Jewish Legion'
 James Armand de Rothschild, DCM Major, 39th Royal Fusiliers Battalion; Captain Royal Canadian Dragoons; a member of the Rothschild family
 Redcliffe N. Salaman, medical officer, from April 1918 in Egypt and Palestine, 38th Battalion, then 39th of Royal Fusiliers
 Edwin Herbert Samuel, 2nd Viscount Samuel; CMG son of Herbert Samuel, 1st Viscount Samuel
 Moshe Smilansky, pioneer of the First Aliyah, a Zionist leader who advocated peaceful coexistence with the Arabs in Mandatory Palestine, a farmer, and a prolific author
 Edward Sperling – humourist and later director-general of the Ministry of Trade and Industry under the British Mandate of Palestine; Killed in the 1946 King David Hotel bombing 
 Eleazar Sukenik, Israeli archaeologist; father of Yigael Yadin
 David Tidhar Police officer, private investigator and author

See also
 Jewish Brigade, a similar military formation of volunteer Jews in the British Army that fought in the Second World War
 Jewish Legion (Anders Army), a proposed unit in the Polish Anders Army in USSR during the Second World War
 Tilhas Tizig Gesheften, organisation which grew out of the Jewish Brigade

References

Further reading
 Patterson, John H. With the Judaeans in the Palestine campaign. Uckfield : Naval & Military Press, [2004 reprint] 
 Jabotinsky, Vladimir. The story of the Jewish Legion. New York: Bernard Ackerman, 1945. 
 Freulich, Roman. Soldiers in Judea: Stories and vignettes of the Jewish Legion. Herzl Press, 1965. 
 Gilner, Elias. Fighting dreamers; a history of the Jewish Legion in World War One,: With a glimpse at other Jewish fighting groups of the period. 1968. 
 Gilner, Elias. War and Hope. A History of the Jewish Legion. New York; Herzl Press: 1969. 
 Keren, Michael and Shlomit Keren, We Are Coming, Unafraid: The Jewish Legions and the Promised Land in the First World War. Lanham MD: Rowman & Littlefield, 2010.  
 Kraines, Oscar. The soldiers of Zion: The Jewish Legion, 1915–1921. 1985. 
 Lammfromm, Arnon, Izhak Ben-Zvi and the Commemoration of Joseph Binyamini: A Failed Attempt to Create a Site of National Heritage", Archion, 17, Winter 2013, pages 48–55, 68 (Hebrew and English abstract)
 Marrion, R.J. "The Jewish Legion," 39th (service) Battalion, Royal Fusiliers (City of London Regiment), 1918–1919. 1987.
 Watts, Martin. The Jewish Legion and the First World War. 2004. 
 "When the spirit of Judah Maccabee hovered over Whitechapel Road and – The march of the 38th Royal Fusiliers" by Martin Sugarman, Western Front Association Journal, Jan 2010.

External links
 The Zion Muleteers of Gallipoli (March 1915 – May 1916) by Martin Sugarman (Jewish Virtual Library). Retrieved 21 June 2006.
 Jewish Legion and Jewish East End of London Link
 CWGC record of I Bendow
 Note Born Israel Bendow Feigelman

 
Jewish military units and formations
Royal Fusiliers
Military units and formations of the British Army in World War I
Military units and formations established in 1917
Military units and formations disestablished in 1921